Clement Gordon Watson (5 April 1912 – 17 April 1945) was a notable New Zealand communist, journalist and soldier. He was born in Mangaweka, Wanganui, New Zealand in 1912.

References

1912 births
1945 deaths
New Zealand communists
New Zealand military personnel killed in World War II
People from Mangaweka
20th-century New Zealand journalists